79 Ceti b (also known as HD 16141 b) is an extrasolar planet orbiting 79 Ceti every 75 days.  Discovered along with HD 46375 b on March 29, 2000, it was the joint first known extrasolar planet to have minimum mass less than the mass of Saturn.

See also
94 Ceti b

References

External links
 SolStation: 79 Ceti
 Extrasolar Planets Encyclopaedia: HD 16141

Cetus (constellation)
Exoplanets discovered in 2000
Giant planets
Exoplanets detected by radial velocity